The Poydras Center is a 28-story, -tall skyscraper located at 650 Poydras Street at the intersection with St. Charles Avenue in the Central Business District of New Orleans, Louisiana.

See also
 List of tallest buildings in New Orleans

References

External links
 Poydras Center, Official Website

Skyscraper office buildings in New Orleans